CFMI may refer to:

 CFMI-FM, a radio station (101.1 FM) licensed to New Westminster, British Columbia, Canada
 CFM International, an aeronautical company
 CareFirst of Maryland, Inc., a BlueCross BlueShield health insurance provider.
 An acronym: Call For More Information